Mexico observed daylight saving time (DST; Spanish: horario de verano) nationwide from 1996 to 2022, even in its tropical regions, because of its increasing economic ties to the United States. It formerly observed the schedule used by the United States prior to 2007, with DST beginning on the first Sunday of April and ending on the last Sunday of October. Although the United States changed the schedule for DST beginning in 2007, only certain municipalities located less than 20 km from the border adopted this change. The rest of the country continued to follow the original schedule before DST was abolished on Sunday, 30 October 2022. The border municipalities in Chihuahua, Coahuila, Nuevo León, and Tamaulipas that changed to observe the schedule of the US continue to do so, as does the entire state of Baja California, beginning DST on the second Sunday of March and ending it on the first Sunday of November.

Overview
The state of Baja California adopted daylight saving time in 1942, due to the state's close ties to the U.S. state of California. This made Baja California the first Mexican state to observe daylight saving time.

The Government of Mexico adopted daylight saving time nationwide in 1996, in order to decrease energy consumption and to facilitate commerce and tourism with the neighboring United States.

In December 2009, Congress gave permission to the municipalities located less than 20 kilometers from the US border to synchronize their time to that of their US counterparts, resulting in these municipalities joining and leaving DST at the same time as the United States, relieving some border problems and confusion.

 Matamoros, Tamaulipas
 Reynosa, Tamaulipas
 Nuevo Laredo, Tamaulipas
 Anáhuac, Nuevo León
 Acuña, Coahuila
 Piedras Negras, Coahuila
 Ojinaga, Chihuahua
 Juárez, Chihuahua
 All of Baja California

Apart from the border municipalities (above), daylight saving time for Mexico began the first Sunday of April, and ended last Sunday of October.

A bill was proposed by Rep. Francisco Saracho (PRI) in September 2015 to reduce confusion by modifying the aforementioned DST start and end dates, observed by the rest of the country, to match those observed by the border municipalities (above). The bill was discarded by congress on June 29, 2016.

In July 2022, President López Obrador proposed a bill to eliminate Daylight Saving Time, along with the results of a survey showing that 71% of the general public support ending it. Certain northern border munincipalities will continue the practice so as to remain harmonized with adjacent US states. This bill was passed on 26 October 2022 and came into effect on the following Sunday, 30 October 2022, so that clocks will stay on standard time permanently after that Sunday's shift from daylight time.

Baja California
The state of Baja California (not Baja California Sur) has observed daylight saving time from several decades ago and until 1996 was the only Mexican state to observe it.

As of 2022, Baja California is the only state that continues to observe DST statewide instead of along a limited border region.

Sonora
The state of Sonora has not observed DST since 1998 because of the non-observance of DST by its neighbor Arizona and its important economic ties with that US state.

Island territories
The Marías Islands and the Revillagigedo Archipelago do not observe DST. The westernmost island of the Revillagigedo Archipelago, Clarion Island, uses UTC−08:00 (PST) all the time.

Quintana Roo
The state of Quintana Roo had decided to not observe DST from February 1, 2015.  At the same time, they switched time zone from CST to EST.

See also
 Daylight saving time by country
 Time in Mexico

References

External links
 Official web of the Electric Savings Fiduciary (Fideicomiso del Ahorro de Energia) of the Mexican Federal Electricity Commission 

Time in Mexico
Mexico